The Family is a private club in San Francisco, California, formed in 1901 by newspapermen who in protest, left the Bohemian Club due to censorship. The club maintains a clubhouse in San Francisco, as well as rural property 35 miles to the south in Woodside. The Family is an exclusive, invitation-only, all-male club where the new members are "Babies", regular members are "Children" and the club president is the "Father".

About 
The Family conducts periodic social events among the redwood and oak trees and open meadows at its rural property on the San Francisco peninsula. The Family Farm entrance is along Portola Road in Woodside.

Among other charitable activities, The Family sponsors a hospital in Guatemala along with volunteer participation from many members. Club rules forbid the use of its facilities or services for the purposes of trade or business. Each member must certify that he will not deduct any part of club payments as business expenses for federal or state income tax purposes.  This practice allows for membership to step away from business entirely and instead pursue friendships and the arts.

History

The Family Club 
The Family Club was formed in 1901 after Ambrose Bierce wrote a poem that seemed to predict President William McKinley's death by an assassin's bullet.  The Hearst chain of newspapers including the "San Francisco Examiner" and others owned by William Randolph Hearst published the poem, and some of the Bohemian Club members took offense.  When McKinley was assassinated shortly thereafter, opponents of Hearst created a fervor over the poem's publication and banned Hearst newspapers from the premises.  A group of 14 reporters, editors, and other Hearst newsmen, in the spirit of true Bohemians and asserting freedom of the press, resigned in protest to the censorship, formed their own club, and called it "The Family".

Early public activities by the club included the sponsoring of a horse race called the "Family Club Handicap" held in Oakland in 1904. A racehorse named "Fossil" took first place, receiving a silver cup from the Family as well as US$1,000 from the California Jockey Club.

The Family clubhouse was originally located at 228 Post Street, but the building was lost two days after the 1906 San Francisco earthquake in the subsequent calamitous fire, though not before serving as a temporary rest station and meal place for earthquake victims such as the bereft Conreid Metropolitan Opera Company. The club rebuilt at the corner of Powell and Bush Streets, and still conducts meetings at this site two blocks from the peak of Nob Hill.

The Family's clubhouse has served as a venue for musical events such as an annual benefit for San Francisco Sinfonietta as well as black-tie dinner lectures by various experts and personages such as Stanlee Gatti speaking to benefit horticultural programs and Charles M. Schulz appearing to promote the Cartoon Art Museum.

The Family Farm 
In 1909, Family club members decided upon the Woodside location for their rural getaways. While summering there in 1912, club members of a variety of religious backgrounds including Judaism, Protestantism and Catholicism pooled their resources to build a Catholic church in nearby Portola Valley: Our Lady of the Wayside Church. Architect member James R. Miller assigned the design of the church to a promising young draftsman at his firm, Timothy L. Pflueger. This was Pflueger's first architectural commission, and was the start of his interaction with The Family. Pflueger would soon join The Family to become a member in good standing, and ultimately designed "The Tavern" at the Family Farm as an indoor performance venue, and a new interior for the City Home clubhouse, both being still in use today.

The annual "Flight Play", as well as a number of other stage and musical performances, are written and performed by club members. Plays aren't published or performed outside of the club, and all original written materials are retained as the sole property of the Club. One handwritten musical score, Thine Enemy, composed by Meredith Willson for the 1937 Flight Play 20 years before The Music Man was staged on Broadway, will be donated by The Family to a museum in the composer's birthplace, Mason City, Iowa.

Artists Diego Rivera and José Clemente Orozco were guests of architect Timothy Pflueger's at The Family Farm in 1930. The two leftist Mexican muralists argued forcefully with one another about art during one visit.

Notable members
General of the Army and General of the Air Force Henry "Hap" Arnold
Edward Bowes, realtor
Ty Cobb, famous baseball player
Colbert Coldwell, founder of Coldwell Banker
Henry J. Crocker, nephew of Charles Crocker, banker, oil magnate, 1903 mayoral candidate, member of the Committee of Fifty (1906)
 Peter Detkin, famous Intellectual Property investor
 Arthur Fiedler, conductor
Herbert Fleishhacker, businessman, civic leader, philanthropist
John Emmett Gerrity, California modernist artist
Henry F. Grady, First US Ambassador to India; Dean of the Commerce department at the University of California, Berkeley; President of American President Lines
Peter E. Haas, Levi-Strauss executive, son of Walter A. Haas
Major General (ret) Jack L. Hancock
William Randolph Hearst, newspaper publisher
Herbert Hoover, President of the United States
Joseph M. Long, founder of Longs Drugs
Clarence W. W. Mayhew, architect
James Rupert Miller, architect
General of the Armies John J. Pershing
Timothy Pflueger, architect
William Saroyan, author and dramatist
Antonio Sotomayor, artist
Colonel Charles Stanton, Pershing's Chief of Staff
George Sterling, poet and playwright
Max Thelen, senior partner at Thelen LLP
Henry Albert van Coenen Torchiana, author, Consul-General from the Netherlands and Commissioner of the Panama-Pacific International Exposition
Meredith Willson, American composer, lyricist, Broadway producer

See also
 List of American gentlemen's clubs
 Olympic Club
 Pacific-Union Club

References

Clubs and societies in California
Gentlemen's clubs in California
Organizations based in San Francisco
Organizations established in 1901
1901 establishments in California
Culture of San Francisco
Bohemian Club
Buildings and structures burned in the 1906 San Francisco earthquake